Interstate 587 (I-587) can refer to two separate highways:

 Interstate 587 (New York)
 Interstate 587 (North Carolina)

87-5